Boarhills is a hamlet close to Kingsbarns in the East Neuk of Fife, Scotland.

History
Boarhills Church, built in 1866–67, stands apart from the village, with a large bellcote at its western end. Boarhills had a primary school, built in 1815 and which closed in the 1990s.

Boarhills had a railway station on the North British Railway line from Thornton Junction to St Andrews via Crail. The station closed to passengers on 22 September 1930 and to goods on 5 October 1964. The line was closed completely on 6 September 1965. This station was sited to the south of the A917.

Buddo Rock is a sandstone sea stack on a raised beach close to Boarhills,  from Buddo Ness, accessible by the Fife Coastal Path. Nearby is a former lifeboat station, built between 1860 and 1890.

Notable residents
 Boarhills has been home to three directors of the Gatty Marine Laboratory: James Munro Dodd, Adrian Horridge and Prof Michael Laverack (1960–85).

References

Villages in Fife